Víctor Mollejo Carpintero (born 21 January 2001) is a Spanish professional footballer who plays as a right winger for Real Zaragoza, on loan from Atlético Madrid.

Club career

Atlético Madrid

2010–2017: Early career 
Born in Alcázar de San Juan, Ciudad Real but raised in Villa de Don Fadrique, Toledo, Mollejo joined Atlético Madrid's youth setup in 2010, from CD Villa de Don Fadrique. On 12 August 2017, he appeared with the first team in a pre-season friendly against CD Leganés, becoming the first player born in the 21st century to appear for the club.

2018–2019: Senior debut 
Promoted to the reserves ahead of the 2018–19 season, Mollejo made his official senior debut on 26 August 2018, starting in a 1–1 Segunda División B away draw against AD Unión Adarve. His first goal occurred on 23 September, as he scored his team's third in a 4–2 win at CDA Navalcarnero.

Mollejo made his professional – and La Liga – debut on 19 January 2019, coming on as a late substitute for Thomas Lemar in a 3–0 away win.

2019–20: Loan to Deportivo de La Coruña 
On 2 September, he joined Segunda División side Deportivo de La Coruña on a season-long loan deal.

Mollejo scored his first professional goal on 18 September 2019, netting his team's first in a 3–3 home draw against CD Numancia. He was Dépor's second-best goalscorer during the campaign with six league goals, but his side was unable to avoid relegation.

2020–21: Loans to Getafe and Mallorca 
On 5 October 2020, Mollejo joined fellow top tier side Getafe CF on loan for the 2020–21 campaign. On 1 February 2021, after just four matches, his loan was cut short.

Immediately after leaving Getafe, Mollejo moved to second division club RCD Mallorca on loan for the remainder of the season.

2021–22: Loan to Tenerife 
On 31 August 2021, Mollejo moved to CD Tenerife also in the second level, on loan for one year.

2022–23: Loan to Zaragoza 
On 18 July 2022, Mollejo agreed to a one-year loan deal with Real Zaragoza still in the second tier.

Personal life 
Since he was nine years old, Mollejo suffers from alopecia.

Career statistics

Club

Honours

International
Spain U19
UEFA European Under-19 Championship: Champion 2019

References

External links

2001 births
Living people
Sportspeople from the Province of Ciudad Real
Spanish footballers
Footballers from Castilla–La Mancha
Association football wingers
La Liga players
Segunda División players
Segunda División B players
Atlético Madrid B players
Atlético Madrid footballers
Deportivo de La Coruña players
Getafe CF footballers
RCD Mallorca players
CD Tenerife players
Real Zaragoza players
Spain youth international footballers
People with alopecia universalis